The Kingdom of Macedonia was a prospective state that was expected to be federated with the Kingdom of Bulgaria, the Kingdom of Greece, the Kingdom of Serbia, the Kingdom of Montenegro as well as the Kingdom of Romania in a sort of Balkan federation. The ruler of the kingdom was proposed to be the Prince Harald of Denmark.

History
On October 30, 1912, Prince Harald, the brother of the King of Denmark, was asked by diplomatic representatives of the Balkan states if he would accept the crown of the future kingdom of Macedonia. He accepted the throne.

The plan of the Balkan allies was to make Macedonia an independent country, after taking it from Turkey (then the Ottoman Empire), and then to federate it with Bulgaria, Serbia, Montenegro and Greece, as well as with Romania.

King George of Greece had been named candidate for president of the federation.

Instead, Macedonia was not made a country, but its territory was divided by Serbia. Greece and Bulgaria.

References

History of Macedonia (region)
Proposed countries